Janine Darcey (14 January 1917 – 1 October 1993) was a French film actress. She appeared in 60 films between 1936 and 1993.

Partial filmography

 La tendre ennemie (1936) - La cousine (uncredited)
 Forty Little Mothers (1936)
 The Assault (1936) - La bonne
 La loupiote (1937) - Une entraîneuse
 Trois artilleurs au pensionnat (1937)
 Franco de port (1937)
 Yoshiwara (1937) - Une geisha (uncredited)
 Double crime sur la ligne Maginot (1937)
 Soeurs d'armes (1937)
 Orage (1938) - La serveuse (uncredited)
 Trois artilleurs en vadrouille (1938)
 The Little Thing (1938) - Camille
 La Plus Belle Fille du monde (1938) - Une midinette
 The Shanghai Drama (1938) - Une élève de l'institution (uncredited)
 The Curtain Rises (1938) - Isabelle
 Je chante (1938) - Denise
 Remontons les Champs-Élysées (1938) - Une biche (uncredited)
 Entente cordiale (1939) - Sylvia Clayton
 Cavalcade d'amour (1939) - Julie
 French Without Tears (1940) - Jacqueline Maingot
 Sixième étage (1940) - Edwige
 The Marvelous Night (1940) - La jeune femme
 Tobias Is an Angel (1940)
 Old Bill and Son (1941) - Françoise
 Parade en sept nuits (1941) - Armande - une amie d'Irène
 Cap au large (1942) - Rose
 Men Without Fear (1942) - Denise
 Les petits riens (1942) - Lucie
 L'auberge de l'abîme (1943) - Martine
 La bonne étoile (1943) - Mireille
 Six petites filles en blanc (1943) - Simone
 Le carrefour des enfants perdus (1944) - Andrée Denolle
 Under the Cards (1948) - Fine
 The Mystery of the Yellow Room (1949) - Sylvie
 Return to Life (1949) - Mary (segment 2 : "Le retour d'Antoine")
 Les Compagnes de la nuit (1953) - 2ème assistante
 Children of Love (1953) - Une future mère
 Rififi (1955) - Louise
 Un témoin dans la ville (1959) - La propriétaire de l'hôtel
 Le glaive et la balance (1963) - Chantal
 Les risques du métier (1967) - Madame Beaudoin - la femme du maire
 The Phantom of Liberty (1974) - La cliente du second médecin (uncredited)
 La Carapate (1978) - La préposée PTT
 L'adolescente (1979)
 Coup de tête (1979) - Mlle Lambert, la secrétaire
 Le Bon Plaisir (1984) - Berthe
 American Dreamer (1984) - Lady on Train
 Le temps d'un instant (1985) - Isa
 To Kill a Priest (1988)
 Moitié-moitié (1989) - Héléna
 The Favour, the Watch and the Very Big Fish (1991) - Old Lady in Park
 Une époque formidable... (1991)
 Un homme et deux femmes (1991) - La tante de Marianne
 Délit mineur (1994) - Yvonne
 Priez pour nous (1994) - Colatte

References

External links

1917 births
1993 deaths
French film actresses
20th-century French actresses